The Elenchus of Biblica was an annual bibliography listing of writings in a given year relating to Biblical studies published by the Pontifical Biblical Institute. It was split off from Biblica in 1969 as Elenchus Bibliographicus Biblicus, obtaining its final name in 1986. Publication was suspended after the 2011 volume.

References

Biblical studies journals
Catholic theology and doctrine
Jewish theology
Publications established in 1969
Annual journals
Publications disestablished in 2011